Ainerigone is a monotypic genus of Asian dwarf spiders containing the single species, Ainerigone saitoi. It was first described by K. Y. Eskov in 1993, and has only been found in Japan, and in Russia.

See also
 List of Linyphiidae species

References

Linyphiidae
Monotypic Araneomorphae genera
Spiders of Asia
Spiders of Russia